Prince Denis (January 26, 1900 – June 20, 1984) was a French-born American actor of sideshows and film with dwarfism, best known for his role as the  Munchkin Sergeant-at-Arms in the 1939 film "The Wizard of Oz".

Early life
Originally from France, Denis moved to the United States and changed his name to Dennison before eventually legally changing it to Prince Denis.

Career
Denis toured various circuses, including the Ringling Brothers and Barnum & Bailey, with his two sisters, Princess Marguerite and Lady Little. Denis would later go on to appear in the 1939 film The Wizard of Oz at the age of 25. His wife Ethel also had a minor role as a Munchkin in the film. He stated that he himself had played the role of the mayor of Munchkinland and that Charlie Becker, who had played the mayor, was selected for playing the sergeant-in-arms. It was later learned that Denis had lied for more publicity.

Denis later went on to appear in films such as The Greatest Show on Earth and Three Wise Fools.

Death
Denis died at the Maricopa Medical Center in Phoenix, Arizona, on June 20, 1984, at the age of 84.

References

1900 births
1984 deaths
Actors with dwarfism
20th-century American male actors
French emigrants to the United States